The 10th Cannes Film Festival was held from 2 to 17 May 1957.

Nights of Cabiria by Federico Fellini, La casa del ángel by Leopoldo Torre Nilsson, A Man Escaped by Robert Bresson, and The Seventh Seal by Ingmar Bergman were entered for the Palme d'Or. They lost to Friendly Persuasion by William Wyler. The festival opened with Around the World in 80 Days by Michael Anderson.
During the 1957 Cannes Film Festival, Dolores del Río was the first female member of the jury for the official selection.

Jury
The following people were appointed as the Jury of the 1957 competition:

Feature films
André Maurois (France) Jury President
Jean Cocteau (France) Honorary President
Maurice Genevoix (France)
Georges Huisman (France) (historian)
Maurice Lehmann (France)
Marcel Pagnol (France)
Michael Powell (UK)
Jules Romains (France)
Dolores del Río (Mexico)
George Stevens (USA)
Vladimír Vlček (Czechoslovakia)
Short films
Claude Aveline (France)
Roman Karmen (Soviet Union)
Albert Lamorisse (France)
Alberto Lattuada (Italy)
Jean Vivie (France) (CST official)

Feature film competition
The following feature films competed for the Palme d'Or:

The Bachelor Party by Delbert Mann
Duped Till Doomsday (Betrogen bis zum jüngsten Tag) by Kurt Jung-Alsen
He Who Must Die (Celui qui doit mourir) by Jules Dassin
The House of the Angel (La Casa del ángel) by Leopoldo Torre Nilsson
Don Quixote (Don Kikhot) by Grigori Kozintsev
Earth (Zemya) by Zahari Zhandov
Faustina by José Luis Sáenz de Heredia
The Forty-First (Sorok pervyy) by Grigori Chukhrai
Friendly Persuasion by William Wyler
Funny Face by Stanley Donen
Gotoma the Buddha by Rajbans Khanna
Guendalina by Alberto Lattuada
The Harvest Month (Elokuu) by Matti Kassila
High Tide at Noon by Philip Leacock
Kanał by Andrzej Wajda
Lapland Calendar (Same Jakki) by Per Høst
Lost Children (Ztracenci) by Miloš Makovec
A Man Escaped (Un condamné à mort s'est échappé ou Le vent souffle où il veut) by Robert Bresson
The Mill of Good Luck (La 'Moara cu noroc) by Victor Iliu
Nights of Cabiria (Le notti di Cabiria) by Federico Fellini
The Rice People (Kome) by Tadashi Imai
Qivitoq by Erik Balling
Rekava by Lester James Peries
Rose Bernd by Wolfgang Staudte
The Seventh Seal (Det sjunde inseglet) by Ingmar Bergman
Shiroi sanmyaku by Sadao Imamura
Sissi - The Young Empress (Sissi - Die junge Kaiserin) by Ernst Marischka
Two Confessions (Két vallomás) by Márton Keleti
Valley of Peace (Dolina miru) by France Štiglic
Whither? (Ila Ayn) by Georges Nasser
Yangtse Incident by Michael Anderson

Out of competition
The following film was selected to be screened out of competition:
Around the World in 80 Days by Michael Anderson

Short film competition
The following short films competed for the Short Film Palme d'Or:

 Altitude 7.546 by I. Grek
 Bolcsok by Ágoston Kollányi
 Carnival in Quebec by Jean Palardy
 City of Gold by Colin Low, Wolf Koenig
 Diario Uruguayo by Eugenio Hintz
 Die Große Wanderung by Walter Suchner
 Een leger van gehouwen steen by Theo Van Haren Noman
 Gast auf Erden by Karl Stanzl
 History of the Cinema by John Halas
 Il sogno dei gonzaga by Antonio Petrucci
 Jabulani Africa by Jok Uys, Jamie Uys
 Śląsk by Witold Lesiewicz
 La mariee portait des perles by Kurt Baum, Errol Hinds
 Let nad mocvarom (Flight Above the Marshes) by Aleksandar Petrović
 Magic of the Mountains by Moham Dayaram Bhavnani
 Michel de ghelderode by Luc De Heusch
 Nessebar by Stephane Topaldjikov
 Niok l'éléphant by Edmond Sechan
 Ochotniki iujnikh morey (Les chasseurs des mers du sud) by S. Kogan
 Paraplícko by Bretislav Pojar
 Rembrandt, schilder van de mens by Bert Haanstra
 San Antonio de la Florida by Santos Núñez
 A Brief History (Scurtă Istorie) by Ion Popescu-Gopo
 Soseiji Gakkyu by Susumu Hani
 Splintret emalje by Johan Jacobsen
 Toute la mémoire du monde by Alain Resnais
 Vacances Tunisiennes by René Vautier
 Western Symphonie by Thomas L. Rowe
 Wiesensommer (Prairie d'été) by Heinz Sielmann

Awards

Official awards
The following films and people received the 1957 awards:
Palme d'Or: Friendly Persuasion by William Wyler 
Jury Special Prize:
Kanał by Andrzej Wajda
The Seventh Seal by Ingmar Bergman
Best Director: Robert Bresson for A Man Escaped
Best Actress: Giulietta Masina for Nights of Cabiria
Special Mention: Elsa Daniel for La casa del ángel
Best Actor: John Kitzmiller for Valley of Peace (Dolina miru)
Special Mentions: Gotoma the Buddha by Rajbans Khanna
Special Award: The Forty-first by Grigori Chukhrai
Best Romantic Documentary:
Shiroi sanmyaku by Sadao Imamura
Qivitoq by Erik BallingShort filmsShort Film Palme d'Or: A Brief History (Scurtă Istorie) by Ion Popescu-Gopo
Special mention: Ochotniki iujnikh morey (Les chasseurs des mers du sud) by S. Kogan
Documentary Prize: City of Gold by Colin Low, Wolf Koenig
Prize for Film in Nature: Wiesensommer (Prairie d'été) by Heinz Sielmann

Independent awardsOCIC Award'''
 Special Mention:He Who Must Die by Jules DassinNights of Cabiria'' by Federico Fellini

References

External links 
 1957 Cannes Film Festival (web.archive)
 Official website Retrospective 1957 
 Cannes Film Festival Awards for 1957 at Internet Movie Database

Media 

 British Pathé: Cannes Film Festival 1957 footage
 British Pathé: Cannes Film Festival 1957 opens
 British Pathé: Cannes Film Festival 1957 ends
 INA: Opening of the 1957 festival (commentary in French)
 INA: Jury at the 1957 Cannes festival (commentary in French)
 INA: Closure of the 1957 Festival (commentary in French)

Cannes Film Festival, 1957
Cannes Film Festival, 1957
Cannes Film Festival